This is an incomplete list of Statutory Rules of Northern Ireland in 1992.

1-100

 Social Security Benefits Up-rating Order (Northern Ireland) 1992 S.R. 1992 No. 18
 Social Security (Disability Living Allowance) Regulations (Northern Ireland) 1992 S.R. 1992 No. 32
 Social Security (Adjudication) (Amendment) Regulations (Northern Ireland) 1992 S.R. 1992 No. 36
 Social Security (Introduction of Disability Living Allowance) Regulations (Northern Ireland) 1992 S.R. 1992 No. 38
 Electricity (1992 Order) (Commencement No. 1) Order (Northern Ireland) 1992 S.R. 1992 No. 63
 Disability Working Allowance (General) Regulations (Northern Ireland) 1992 S.R. 1992 No. 78

101-200

 Social Security (Barbados) Order (Northern Ireland) 1992 S.R. 1992 No. 151
 Fertilisers Regulations (Northern Ireland) 1992 S.R. 1992 No. 187

201-300

 Births, Deaths and Marriages (Fees) Order (Northern Ireland) 1992 S.R. 1992 No. 217
 Companies (Disclosure of Interests in Shares) (Orders Imposing Restrictions on Shares) Regulations (Northern Ireland) 1992 S.R. 1992 No. 257
 Companies (1986 Order) (Bank Accounts) Regulations (Northern Ireland) 1992 S.R. 1992 No. 258
 Road Traffic (Carriage of Dangerous Substances in Road Tankers and Tank Containers) Regulations (Northern Ireland) 1992 S.R. 1992 No. 260
 Social Security (Australia) Order (Northern Ireland) 1992 S.R. 1992 No. 269
 Feeding Stuffs Regulations (Northern Ireland) 1992 S.R. 1992 No. 270

301-400

 Students Awards Regulations (Northern Ireland) 1992 S.R. 1992 No. 363
 County Courts (Financial Limits) Order (Northern Ireland) 1992 S.R. 1992 No. 372
 Registration (Land and Deeds) (1992 Order) (Commencement No. 1) Order (Northern Ireland) 1992 S.R. 1992 No. 393
 Insolvency (Fees) (Amendment) Order (Northern Ireland) 1992 S.R. 1992 No. 398

401-500

 Housing (1992 Order) (Commencement) Order (Northern Ireland) 1992 S.R. 1992 No. 402
 Companies (Single Member Private Limited Companies) Regulations (Northern Ireland) 1992 S.R. 1992 No. 405
 Health and Safety (Miscellaneous Provisions) Regulations (Northern Ireland) 1992 S.R. 1992 No. 413

501-600

 Companies (1986 Order) (Accounts of Small and Medium-Sized Enterprises and Publication of Accounts in ECUs) Regulations (Northern Ireland) 1992 S.R. 1992 No. 503
 Education Reform (1989 Order) (Commencement No. 6) Order (Northern Ireland) 1992 S.R. 1992 No. 507
 Social Security Benefit (Dependency) (Amendment) Regulations (Northern Ireland) 1992 S.R. 1992 No. 521
 Local Government (Superannuation) Regulations (Northern Ireland) 1992 S.R. 1992 No. 547

External links
  Statutory Rules (NI) List
 Draft Statutory Rules (NI) List

1992
Statutory rules
1992 in law
Northern Ireland Statutory Rules